Robert Marie Auguste George (born 4 October 1932) is a Belgian rower. 

George was born in 1932. His father was Jules Georges who competed at the 1924 Summer Olympics in the men's coxed four. George won the Double Sculls Challenge Cup at the 1952 Henley Royal Regatta. He competed in the men's double sculls event at the 1952 Summer Olympics where they were eliminated in the semi-final repechage.

References

1932 births
Living people
Belgian male rowers
Olympic rowers of Belgium
Rowers at the 1952 Summer Olympics
Sportspeople from Liège